Frank Shuster,  (September 5, 1916 – January 13, 2002) was a Canadian comedian best known as a member of the comedy duo Wayne and Shuster, alongside Johnny Wayne.

Life and career 
Shuster was born to a Jewish immigrant family in Toronto, Ontario, and spent part of his childhood in Niagara Falls. His family returned to Toronto in time for Shuster to attend high school at Toronto's Harbord Collegiate Institute, where he met Johnny Wayne in 1930. The two would soon be performing sketches and routines at school talent shows, continuing to do the same when they both attended the University of Toronto.

By the early 1940s Wayne and Shuster began appearing on local radio station CFRB, and during World War II they joined the Canadian Army as performers, entertaining Canadian troops, and performed on the CBC Radio series The Army Show. After the war, the duo appeared on CBC radio and television, becoming a network fixture with regular appearances from the 1940s through the 1980s. They appeared on The Ed Sullivan Show over 66 times. The duo would remain a comedy team for 50 years, until Wayne's death in 1990.

In 1996, Shuster was made an Officer of the Order of Canada.

Personal life 
Shuster was married to Ruth Shuster and had two children: Rosie and Steve. Rosie Shuster was a comedy writer for Saturday Night Live and other television programs, and former wife of Lorne Michaels. Steve Shuster, a standup comic, writer, musician, and actor, died in 2017 at the age of 67.

He was also the cousin of Joe Shuster, co-creator of Superman.

Death 
Frank Shuster died on January 13, 2002, in Toronto, Ontario, at the age of 85.

References

External links
 
 
 
 Frank Shuster fonds (R4610) at Library and Archives Canada

1916 births
2002 deaths
Canadian people of Dutch-Jewish descent
Canadian male television actors
Canadian television personalities
Comedians from Toronto
Jewish Canadian male actors
Jewish Canadian comedians
Male actors from Toronto
Officers of the Order of Canada
University of Toronto alumni
Canadian sketch comedians
20th-century Canadian comedians